Li Ning Star Ladies is a Chinese women's road cycling team that was founded in 2022.

Roster
As of April 1, 2022

References

Cycling teams based in China
Cycling teams established in 2022